Ghurkauli is a town and market center in Hariyon Municipality in Sarlahi District in the Janakpur Zone of south-eastern Nepal. The formerly village development committee was transformed into municipality merging the existing village development committees i.e. Atrouli, Sasapur, Ghurkauli and Hariyon on May 18, 2014. At the time of the 1991 Nepal census it had a population of 7336 people living in 1253 individual households.

References

External links
UN map of the municipalities of Sarlahi  District

Populated places in Sarlahi District